Han Kwang-song (born 11 September 1998) is a North Korean professional footballer who plays as a forward.

Club career

Cagliari

2017: Debut year 
Han Kwang-song joined Cagliari at academy level in 2017, after a successful trial period. Han became the first North Korean to play in the Serie A in a 3–1 away win over Palermo, on 2 April 2017, appearing as a substitute for Marco Sau in the 86th minute. He scored his first goal for the club in a 3–2 home defeat to Torino on 9 April with the final goal of the game 5 minutes into stoppage time, thereby becoming the first North Korean to score in Serie A. On 13 April 2017, Han signed a contract extension to continue to play for Cagliari until 2022. He played a total of five league games, scoring once.

2017–18: First loan to Perugia 
On 7 August 2017, he was loaned to Serie B team Perugia. He debuted for the club in the Coppa Italia third-round game against Benevento, which Perugia won 4–0. On 27 August 2017, Han scored a hat-trick on his Serie B debut for Perugia in a 5–1 win over Virtus Entella.

Han scored seven league goals for Perugia in 17 games during the 2017–18 season, before returning to Cagliari on 1 February 2018.

2018: Return from loan 
Han's first game as a starter for Cagliari, and in Serie A, came on 27 February in a 5–0 home defeat against Napoli. He played seven league games in the 2017–18 season.

2018–19: Second loan to Perugia 
On 15 August 2018, Han joined on loan to Perugia for a second time. Initially unable to play due to an injury, Han scored his first seasonal goal against Ascoli in a 0–3 away win. He ended the 2018–19 season with four goals in 20 league games.

2019–2020: Loan to Juventus 
On 2 September 2019, Han secured a deadline day move to Juventus on a two-year loan from Cagliari, with an obligation to purchase at the end of the term. The Serie A champions moved him to their reserve team playing in Serie C: Juventus U23. On 26 October, Han was called-up to the first team for the Serie A game against Lecce, becoming the first player from Asia to be called-up for Juventus. On 6 November, he converted a penalty to beat Alessandria 1–0 in a Coppa Italia Serie C match. Han scored one goal and made two assists in 20 appearances for Juventus U23.

Al-Duhail

2020–21: Qatar Stars League champion 
On 2 January 2020, Juventus bought Han from Cagliari for €3.5 million, before selling him to Qatari side Al-Duhail six days later for €7 million. He made his debut for Al-Duhail in the Qatar Cup semi-finals on 10 January, in a 2–0 win over Al-Sailiya, coming on as a substitute for Edmilson Junior in the 83th minute. He lost the final 4–0 to Al Sadd seven days later. Han made his Qatar Stars League debut on 24 January, in a 3–1 win over Al-Arabi.

Han's first goals for Al-Duhail came on 6 February, scoring a brace against Muaither in the Emir of Qatar Cup quarter-finals; his side won 4–0. On 11 February, Han debuted in the Asian Champions League against Persepolis, helping his side win 2–0. Han's first league goal came on 22 February, scoring the maiden goal of the match against Al-Wakrah. He scored in the following two consecutive games, on 27 February and 7 March, against Al-Shahania and Al-Sailiya respectively.

Han scored five goals in 14 domestic games, and played two Asian Champions League games. He helped his side win the Qatar Stars League. Due to the sanctions against North Korea, which prevents North Koreans from working abroad, Han was released by Al-Duhail and was due to return to his country.

International career 

Han made his senior debut for North Korea on 6 June 2017, in a friendly against Qatar. He played in the 2019 AFC Asian Cup qualifiers, helping North Korea qualify to the final tournament. Han was called up for the final squad, playing against Saudi Arabia – against whom he was sent off – and Lebanon in the group stage. His first international goal came on 14 November 2019, in a 2022 FIFA World Cup qualification match against Turkmenistan.

Style of play 
An ambidextrous player, Han's main characteristics are his dribbling, eye for goal and vision of the game.

Personal life 
Han is subject to the politics of the North Korean government; he cannot give interviews, and it is alleged that most of his salary is sent to the government. Due to United Nations (UN) sanctions, which prohibit North Korean citizens from working abroad due to the country's nuclear programme, Han cannot play overseas. Indeed, the UN cited his transfer from Juventus to Al-Duhail as a violation of their international sanctions.

Career statistics

Club

International 

Scores and results list Han's goal tally first, score column indicates score after each North Korea goal.

Honours
Al-Duhail
 Qatar Stars League: 2019–20
 Qatar Cup runner-up: 2020

North Korea U16
 AFC U-16 Championship: 2014

References

External links

 
 
 

1998 births
Living people
Sportspeople from Pyongyang
North Korean footballers
Association football forwards
Chobyong Sports Club players
Cagliari Calcio players
A.C. Perugia Calcio players
Juventus F.C. players
Juventus Next Gen players
Al-Duhail SC players
Serie A players
Serie B players
Serie C players
Qatar Stars League players
North Korea youth international footballers
North Korea international footballers
2019 AFC Asian Cup players
North Korean expatriate footballers
North Korean expatriate sportspeople in Italy
North Korean expatriate sportspeople in Qatar
Expatriate footballers in Italy
Expatriate footballers in Qatar